Sheikh Abdullah bin Nasser bin Abdullah Al Ahmed Al Thani is a Qatari businessman. He is from the Qatari ruling family and a distant relative of Qatar's previous ruler Sheikh Hamad. He owns the Spanish Segunda Division football club Málaga CF as well as several thoroughbred racing horses.

Family
According to the Royal Ark website, he is the great-grandson of Ahmed bin Muhammed Al Thani, the brother of later emir Jassim bin Mohammed Al Thani and son of Hakim Mohammed bin Thani. His father, Nasser bin Abdullah bin Ahmed Al Thani, was the chairman of Nasser bin Abdulla & Sons Group and after he died in 1990 chairmanship of the Group was bequeathed to his son Abdullah.

His namesake, Abdullah bin Nasser bin Khalifa Al Thani, is his second cousin, the preceding emir of Qatar, Hamad bin Khalifa Al Thani, is Abdullah's distant cousin.

Career
Al Thani was appointed a non-executive member of board of directors of Doha Bank in June 1996. He is also a member of the board of Nasser Bin Abdulla & Sons Group.

In June 2010, Sheikh Abdullah bought Málaga CF from Lorenzo Sanz, whose son Fernando Sanz and president of the club at the time, controlled with total management the acquisition. The reported price was €36 million. In February 2020, a Spanish judge ruled that he was to be excluded from management and control of the club, citing irregularities. The court case is ongoing as of October 2022.

Sheikh Abdullah has been quoted as saying, in anticipation of the 2022 FIFA World Cup to be held in Qatar, he had hoped to have European clubs branch into the Arabian Gulf market. He is currently a member of the board of directors of Qatar Equestrian Federation.

References

External links
Twitter : ANAALthani
Sheikh Al Thani profile at Malaga Football
Horse data
Puerto Al-Thani.com – Marbella Port to be redeveloped and renamed Puerto Al-Thani
(the project & news)

Qatari businesspeople
Qatari expatriates in Spain
Abdullah bin Nasser
People from Doha
Málaga CF
Spanish football chairmen and investors
1969 births
Living people